Bangor is a borough located in Northampton County, Pennsylvania, United States. It had a population of 5,187 as of the 2020 census. Bangor is part of the Lehigh Valley metropolitan area, which had a population of 861,899 and was thus the 68th most populous metropolitan area in the U.S. as of the 2020 census.

History
The borough was settled about 1760 and first incorporated in 1875. The founder and first Chief Burgess of Bangor was Robert M. Jones, an emigrant from Bangor, Wales. He was the prime mover in the establishment of the slate industry in Northampton County. Slate quarries pepper the area, but only a few are still functioning.  A life-sized statue of him, dedicated on September 24, 1914, remains in the town center. Indeed, if one visits Bangor, Wales it is clearly visible that the Welsh heritage made its way to Bangor, Pennsylvania, whose stone walls, square gardens, and flowers and greenery mirror those of its Welsh namesake. Around Bangor one can also see piles of slate residue and shale reminiscent of the area around Bethesda, Wales.

The population of Bangor was 2,509 in 1890; 4,106 in 1900; 5,369 in 1910; and 5,687 in 1940. The population was 5,273 at the 2010 census. The Bridge in Bangor Borough and Real Estate Building are listed on the National Register of Historic Places.

Geography
Bangor is located at  (40.866749, -75.210759).

Demographics

As of the census of 2000, there were 5,319 people, 2,105 households, and 1,420 families residing in the borough. The population density was 3,453.4 inhabitants per square mile (1,333.6/km2). There were 2,249 housing units at an average density of 1,460.2 per square mile (563.9/km2). The racial makeup of the borough was 97.9% White, 0.5% African American, 0.2% Native American, 0.3% Asian, 0.3% from other races, and 0.8% from two or more races. Hispanic or Latino of any race were 0.8% of the population.

The plurality of Bangor residents are of German, Welsh, and Pennsylvania Dutch descent.

There were 2,105 households, out of which 35.2% had children under the age of 18 living with them, 50.4% were married couples living together, 11.8% had a female householder with no male householder present, and 32.5% were non-families. 28.6% of all households were made up of individuals, and 14.9% had someone living alone who was 65 years of age or older. The average household size was 2.52 and the average family size was 3.09.

In the borough, the population was spread out, with 27.7% under the age of 18, 6.9% from 18 to 24, 31.2% from 25 to 44, 17.8% from 45 to 64, and 16.4% who were 65 years of age or older. The median age was 36 years. For every 100 females there were 91.1 males. For every 100 females age 18 and over, there were 86.6 males. The median income for a household in the borough was $36,382, and the median income for a family was $44,954. Males had a median income of $36,972 versus $21,414 for females. The per capita income for the borough was $17,742. About 8.5% of families and 13.1% of the population were below the poverty line, including 19.0% of those under age 18 and 15.1% of those age 65 or over.

Public education
The borough is served by the Bangor Area School District. The district has one high school, Bangor Area High School, for grades nine through 12, one middle school, and three elementary schools: Five Points Elementary School, Washington Elementary School, and Domenick DeFranco Elementary. Five Points Elementary hosts kindergarten through second grade. Washington Elementary contains third and fourth grade, while Domenick DeFranco Elementary contains grades five and six.

Transportation

Pennsylvania Route 191 runs north-south through Bangor, leading south toward Nazareth and Bethlehem and north toward Stroudsburg. Pennsylvania Route 512 (signed north-south) runs east-west through Bangor, leading east (north) toward Portland and west (south) toward Pen Argyl and Wind Gap. Bangor is served by the 217 bus to Bethlehem, operated by LANTA.

Notable people
Carl Henry Hoffman, former U.S. Congressman
George Lakey, non-violent revolution activist and sociologist
Howard Lesnick, former law professor, University of Pennsylvania Law School
 Gladys Reichard, former anthropologist and linguist
Sound the Alarm, pop rock band

References

External links

Official borough website

1875 establishments in Pennsylvania
Boroughs in Northampton County, Pennsylvania
Boroughs in Pennsylvania
Populated places established in 1760